See also 2007 in birding and ornithology, main events of 2008 and 2009 in birding and ornithology
The year 2008 in birding and ornithology.

Worldwide

New species

See also Bird species new to science described in the 2000s
The olive-backed forest robin is first described by Smithsonian ornithologists who discovered it in Gabon.

Taxonomic developments

Ornithologists

Deaths
Johnathan Claud 1972-2008
Barbara De Wolfe
Derek Goodwin
Harrison B. Tordoff
Himmatsinhji M. K.
Jennifer F. M. Horne
John Danzenbaker
Melvin Alvah Traylor, Jr.
Robert W. Storer

World listing

Europe

Britain

Breeding birds

Migrant and wintering birds

Rare birds
Britain's second American purple gallinule found dead in April or May 2008 at Old Warden Bedfordshire.

Other events

Ireland

Rare birds

Scandinavia
To be completed

North America
To be completed

References

Birding and ornithology
Bird
Birding and ornithology by year